The following is a list of notable events and releases that happened in 2000 in music in South Korea.

Debuting and disbanded in 2000

Debuting groups
CB Mass
Chakra
Cherry Filter
Moon Child
Papaya
UN

Solo debuts
BoA
Hwayobi
Jiwon
Lyn
Wax

Disbanded groups
Sechs Kies
Turbo
Uptown

Releases in 2000

January

February

March

April

May

June

July

August

September

October

November

December

See also
2000 in South Korea
List of South Korean films of 2000

References

 
South Korean music
K-pop